Park Kyung-soo (born January 25, 1969) is a South Korean television screenwriter. Park is known for his works on SBS television series, The Chaser (2012), Empire of Gold (2013) and Punch (2014–2015).

Filmography 
KAIST Kaist (SBS, 1999–2000)
Special of My Life (MBC, 2006)
The Legend (MBC, 2007)
The Chaser (SBS, 2012)
Empire of Gold (SBS, 2013)
Punch (SBS, 2014–2015)
Whisper (SBS, 2017)

Awards 
2013 49th Baeksang Arts Awards: Best Screenplay (TV) (The Chaser) 
2013 40th Korea Broadcasting Awards: Best Screenwriter (The Chaser) 
2015 51st Baeksang Arts Awards: Best Screenplay (TV) (Punch)
2015 4th APAN Star Awards: Best Writer (Punch)
2015 4th CARI K Drama Awards: Best Screenplay (Punch)

References

External links
 Park Kyung-soo at Pan Entertainment 
 
 

1969 births
Living people
South Korean screenwriters
South Korean television writers